Wireless transmission may refer to:

Radio, the wireless transmission of signals through free space by radio waves instead of cables, like telegraphs
Wireless communication, all types of non-wired communication
Wireless power, the transmission of electrical energy without man-made conductors